The 2018 season was the 68th season of competitive association football in China.

Promotion and relegation

National teams

China national football team

China women's national football team

AFC competitions

2018 AFC Champions League

Men's Football

League season

Chinese Super League

China League One

China League Two

North Group

South Group

Overall table

Play-offs

25th–26th place

23rd–24th place

21st–22nd place

19th–20th place

17th–18th place

15th–16th place

13th–14th place

11th–12th place

9th–10th place

Quarter-finals

Semi-finals

Third-Place Match

Final Match

Cup competitions

Chinese FA Cup

Chinese FA Super Cup

Women's Football

References

 
Seasons in Chinese football